Kenneth Casey Robinson (October 17, 1903 – December 6, 1979) was an American producer and director of mostly B movies and a screenwriter responsible for some of Bette Davis' most revered films. Film critic Richard Corliss once described him as "the master of the art – or craft – of adaptation."

Early life and Hollywood career

Born in Logan, Utah, the son of a Brigham Young University music/drama instructor, Robinson graduated from Cornell University at the age of 19 and briefly taught English before turning to journalism. 
In 1927, he began his Hollywood career writing the titles for silent movies. He graduated to directing in the early 1930s, but after six films he abandoned that field in order to concentrate on writing. The films with Davis included It's Love I'm After, Dark Victory, The Old Maid, All This, and Heaven Too, Now, Voyager, and The Corn Is Green.

Robinson's production credits include Days of Glory, Under My Skin, and Two Flags West, all of which he scripted as well. He also worked on three weeks of re-writes for Casablanca, but was uncredited. In 1935, Robinson was a write-in candidate for what was then called the Academy Award for Best Writing, Screenplay for his work on Captain Blood.

After spending the better part of the 1930s and the early 1940s working at Warner Bros., Robinson moved to MGM in the mid-'40s, then to 20th Century Fox in the 1950s. He retired in 1962 and eventually emigrated to Sydney, Australia (his wife was Australian). While in Sydney he came out of retirement to write and produce Scobie Malone, in 1975.

His second wife was prima ballerina Tamara Toumanova; they were wed from 1944 until their divorce in 1955. The union was childless. He died in Sydney, Australia in 1979, aged 76.

Selected filmography
Bare Knees (1928)
Out of the Ruins (1928)
 The Head of the Family (1928)
Companionate Marriage (1928)
United States Smith (1928)
 Times Square (1929)
The Squealer  (1930)
 The Last Parade (1931)
I Found Stella Parish (1935)
Captain Blood (1935)
It's Love I'm After (1937)
Tovarich (1937)
Four's a Crowd (1938)
Dark Victory (1939)
The Old Maid (1939)
All This, and Heaven Too (1940)
One Foot in Heaven (1941)
Kings Row (1942)
Now, Voyager (1942)
This Is the Army (1943)
Passage to Marseille (1944)
The Racket Man (1944)
Days of Glory (1944) (also producer)
The Corn Is Green (1945)
Father Was a Fullback (1949)
The Snows of Kilimanjaro (1952)
The Egyptian (1954)
While the City Sleeps (1956)
Scobie Malone (1975) (also producer)

References

External links

1903 births
1979 deaths
Writers from Logan, Utah
American male screenwriters
American film producers
Cornell University alumni
20th-century American businesspeople
Film directors from Utah
Screenwriters from Utah
American emigrants to Australia
20th-century American male writers
20th-century American screenwriters